is a former Japanese football player.

Playing career
Matsunaga was born in Nakatsu on November 13, 1977. After graduating from high school, he joined J1 League club Sanfrecce Hiroshima in 1996. Although he played several matches as forward, he could not play many matches. In 2000, he moved to Avispa Fukuoka. However he could hardly play in the match. In 2001, he moved to Regional Leagues club Profesor Miyazaki. The club was promoted to Japan Football League (JFL) from 2002. In 2002, he moved to Singapore club Jurong. In 2002, he returned to Profesor Miyazaki. In 2003, he moved to JFL club Tochigi SC. He played as regular player in 2 seasons. In 2005, he moved to JFL club ALO's Hokuriku. However he could hardly play in the match. In 2006, he moved to Regional Leagues club Banditonce Kobe. In 2007, he moved to Mitsubishi Mizushima. He retired end of 2008 season.

Club statistics

References

External links

biglobe.ne.jp

1977 births
Living people
Association football people from Ōita Prefecture
Japanese footballers
J1 League players
Japan Football League players
Sanfrecce Hiroshima players
Avispa Fukuoka players
Estrela Miyazaki players
Tochigi SC players
Kataller Toyama players
Mitsubishi Mizushima FC players
Association football forwards